Borja Carrascosa (born 5 February 1982) is a Spanish dressage rider. He represented Spain at the 2014 World Equestrian Games in Normandy, France where he finished 5th in team dressage and 71st in the individual dressage competition.

References

External links
 

Living people
1982 births
Spanish male equestrians
Spanish dressage riders